The Norwegian football club IK Start returned to the top league Tippeligaen for the 2013 season. It was their second full season with Mons Ivar Mjelde as manager, and they finished the season in 9th place. They also took part in the Norwegian Cup, reaching the quarter-finals stage before being beaten by Lillestrøm.

Squad
As of 1 February 2013.

Transfers

Winter

In:

Out:

Summer

In:

Out:

Competitions

Tippeligaen

Results summary

Results

Table

Norwegian Cup

Squad statistics

Appearances and goals

|-
|colspan="14"|Players away from Start on loan:
|-
|colspan="14"|Players who left Start during the season:
|}

Goal scorers

Disciplinary record

Notes

References

IK Start seasons
Start